Zoltán Lévai (born January 30, 1996) is a Hungarian Greco-Roman wrestler. He won the silver medal in the 77 kg event at the 2022 World Wrestling Championships held in Belgrade, Serbia. He also won the silver medal in the 77 kg event at the 2020 European Wrestling Championships held in Rome, Italy.

Career 

He competed in the 82 kg event at the 2019 World Wrestling Championships held in Nur-Sultan, Kazakhstan. He was eliminated in his second match by Rajbek Bisultanov of Denmark.

In 2020, he won the silver medal in the 77 kg event at the European Wrestling Championships held in Rome, Italy. He also won the silver medal in this event at the 2020 Individual Wrestling World Cup held in Belgrade, Serbia.

In 2021, he won the gold medal in the 77 kg event at the Matteo Pellicone Ranking Series 2021 held in Rome, Italy.

He won the silver medal in the 77kg event at the 2022 World Wrestling Championships held in Belgrade, Serbia.

Achievements

References

External links 
 

Living people
Place of birth missing (living people)
Hungarian male sport wrestlers
European Wrestling Championships medalists
World Wrestling Championships medalists
21st-century Hungarian people
1996 births